Shanghai Meishan Iron and Steel Co., Ltd., known as Meishan Iron and Steel, or Meisteel or Meigang is a second-tier subsidiary of Baowu (formerly known as Baosteel Group) and a first-tier subsidiary of listed company Baoshan Iron and Steel Co., Ltd. (Baosteel). The company was based in Nanjing.

In 2004, Baosteel Group decided to inject Shanghai Meishan Iron and Steel Co., Ltd. to fellow subsidiary Baoshan Iron and Steel Co., Ltd., which is also a listed company.

History

Meishan Iron & Steel
The mine became a quasi-exclave of Shanghai. In 1984, the steel plant and related industries became Shanghai Meishan Metallurgical Corporation. The company was registered in the Government of Nanjing in 1990.

In 1994, a new holding company was formed for Meishan Group, which the mine was spin-off from Meishan Metallurgical Corporation in 1995, while the iron and steel company became Shanghai Meishan Iron and Steel Co., Ltd..

The company became a subsidiary of Baosteel Group in 1998. Meishan Iron and Steel was listed as one of the 512 most important state-owned enterprises in 1997, in the iron and steel industry segment that consist of 47 companies.

The company was re-incorporated in 2001 by debt-to-equity swap. The deal was completed in 2005.

In 2008, Meishan Iron & Steel signed a contract with Praxair to build two more new air separation plants in Meishan.

In 2018, it was announced that the steel plant of the company would be relocated to Yancheng, Jiangsu Province in the 2020s.

Former Shanghai Meishan Group
"Shanghai Meishan (Group) Co., Ltd." was the holding company of Meishan Iron & Steel and other subsidiaries. It was founded in 1994. Meishan Group merged with Baosteel Group in 1998. The assets of Meishan Group were absorbed by "Baosteel Group Shanghai Meishan Co., Ltd." some time later. After the partial demerger in 2004, Baosteel Group Shanghai Meishan Ltd. still owned Shanghai Meishan Mining (incorporated in 1995) the mining company in the unlisted portion of the conglomerate. The company became part of "Nanjing Meishan Metallurgical Development", a subsidiary of "Baosteel Group Shanghai Meishan Co., Ltd." in 2010. As at 31 December 2015, "Baosteel Group Shanghai Meishan Co., Ltd." had net assets of just , much smaller in size than its sister company Meishan Iron and Steel.

Shareholders

 Baoshan Iron and Steel (77.04%)
 a wholly owned subsidiary of China Development Bank (9.14%)
 China Orient Asset Management (7.02%)
 a subsidiary of the Government of Nanjing (6.80%)

Data

References

External links
 Official website of Baoshan Iron and Steel Co., Ltd. 
 Official website of Baosteel Group Shanghai Meishan Co., Ltd. 

Chinese companies established in 1990
Steel companies of China
Manufacturing companies based in Nanjing
China Orient Asset Management
Baowu
Companies owned by the provincial government of China
Government-owned companies of China
1990 establishments in China